Hemiorchis is a genus of plants in the ginger family. It contains three recognized species, native to the eastern Himalayas from Nepal to Myanmar.

 Hemiorchis burmanica Kurz - Myanmar
 Hemiorchis pantlingii King - Assam, Nepal, Bhutan, Arunachal Pradesh, Myanmar 
 Hemiorchis rhodorrhachis K.Schum. in H.G.A.Engler  - Assam, Bhutan, Arunachal Pradesh, Myanmar

References

Zingiberoideae
Zingiberaceae genera